On 3 May 2021, at 22:22 CDT (UTC−5), an overpass in the borough of Tláhuac carrying Line 12 of the Mexico City Metro collapsed beneath a passing train. The overpass and the last two cars of the train fell onto Tláhuac Avenue near Olivos station, killing 26 people and injuring 98 others. It was the Metro's deadliest accident in almost fifty years.

The line experienced technical and structural problems that led to a partial closure of the elevated section where the accident occurred between 2014 and 2015. An earthquake in 2017 further damaged the span; although it was repaired within a few months, residents reported problems still existed years later. The line was announced in 2007 as an underground line with the possibility of operating rubber-tired trains because of the instability of the city's soil. The line was scheduled to be opened by 2010 but due to the budget and time constraints, the project was modified to operate both underground and overground with steel-wheeled trains, which researchers have named as one of the causes of track instabilities and damage since the beginning of the line's operations. Empresas ICA, the company that built the system's other lines, constructed it with Alstom Mexicana and Grupo Carso—the latter owned by Carlos Slim. 

Claudia Sheinbaum, mayor of the city, hired the Norwegian risk management firm Det Norske Veritas (DNV) to investigate the causes of the collapse; preliminary investigations found it was related to deficiencies in the construction of the bridge, and a lack of functional studs and poor-quality welds that led to fatigue in the collapsed beam. Further investigations led them to conclude the bridge was designed and built without quality standards, that the construction and the line's design changes had been inadequately supervised, that there was a lack of fixing and safety elements, and that periodic maintenance checks that would have detected the girder buckling had not been done—the last statement being contested by the city government.

Carso, the company responsible for the construction of the collapsed section, denied any wrongdoing but Slim agreed with the government of Mexico to repair the section free of charge.

Background

Metro system

The Sistema de Transporte Colectivo (STC) operates the Mexico City Metro, one of the world's busiest urban transportation systems that carries around 4.5 million passengers a day. STC, which commenced operations in 1969, is the second-largest metro system in North America after the New York City Subway system.

Prior to the collapse, the rail system had shown signs of deterioration, and concerns about its maintenance were raised. In March 2020, two trains collided at Tacubaya station after one driver failed to follow parking protocols, causing the train's brakes to fail. In January 2021, a fire in the Metro's downtown headquarters killed a police officer, hospitalized 30 people, and took six subway lines out of service for several days. In April, Line 4 was closed after a fire on the tracks.

In December 2018, the recently appointed mayor of Mexico City Claudia Sheinbaum appointed Florencia Serranía to the position of STC general director. Serranía had served in the same position from 2004 to 2006 during the governorship of Andrés Manuel López Obrador, who was President of Mexico when the collapse happened. From 2020 to April 2021, the post of STC deputy director-general of maintenance was vacant and Serranía assigned herself as manager of the position.

Line 12 

Line 12, also known as the Golden Line in reference to its color on the system map, runs from south-central Mexico City to the semi-rural, southeastern borough of Tláhuac, serving around 350,000 passengers per day. It was constructed by Empresas ICA in association with Alstom Mexicana and Grupo Carso. The head of government of Mexico City Marcelo Ebrard announced the line in August 2007, and construction began in September 2008. The opening was expected to coincide with the 200th anniversary of Mexico's independence in 2010, but multiple construction delays postponed its inauguration by Ebrard and president Felipe Calderón to October 2012. The project's cost of MX$26 billion (US$1.29 billion as of 2021) exceeded projections by about 50 percent.

Line 12 runs underground through central parts of the city and is elevated in outlying areas. The line was originally planned to be built mostly underground, and was to have 23 stations—20 of them from Mixcoac to Nopalera underground; and the last three—Zapotitlán, Tlaltenco and Tláhuac—were planned as at-grade stations. Due to budget constraints, the project was modified to have nine underground stations from Mixcoac to Atlalilco, nine elevated stations from Culhuacán to Zapotitlán, and Tlaltenco and Tláhuac as at-grade stations. The elevated inter-station sections were built with concrete columns that carry two parallel metal beams to support the girders; the foundations are built on rocky soil.

Rolling stock

The FE-10 train model, which was manufactured by Construcciones y Auxiliar de Ferrocarriles (CAF), is  exclusively used on Line 12. The FE-10 uses steel wheels, whereas other lines in the system, with the exception of Line A, use rubber tires. Francisco Bojórquez, then-general director of the Metro system, recommended using rubber tires, which he considered to be a more-secure option but an internal labor commission disagreed with his opinion and supported the use of less-costly steel wheels. FE-10 trains have a capacity of 1,900 passengers and are gangway models, allowing users to move between cars.

CAF received a concession for the trains from 2010 to 2026 with a US$1.588 billion contract; it was the first time STC did not directly buy the trains. SYSTRA, a multinational engineering and consulting group, wrote train operations were within the accepted safety limits. Technischer Überwachungsverein recommended replacing the trains due to excessive wear of the wheels and rails caused by the mismatch between both.

Issues

From the start of service, Line 12 experienced problems with trains on elevated sections. Before the start of pre-operational testing with trains, topographic monitoring detected subsidence on several columns. Personnel recorded vibrations on the tracks in the Tláhuac borough area. Passenger testing began in June 2012; in the subsequent months, the Metro system recorded damage to around 10,000 ties due to vibrations. In March 2014, the elevated section was closed for 20 months for repairs of technical and structural faults. The government of the city created a special board to investigate the causes of the problems and hold officials accountable for the errors that led to the partial closure. Among those investigated was Ebrard, who went into self-imposed exile in France in 2015, saying he was the target of a political vendetta created by Miguel Ángel Mancera, his successor. Thirty-three officials and ex-officials, including Enrique Horcasitas, the director of the Line 12 project, were sanctioned with disqualifications from public work, fines, or both.

In 2014, the government of Mancera hired SYSTRA to independently submit a report on their investigation. After the group reviewed over 2,900 documents and tested the tracks, the team concluded errors were made during the "planning, design, construction and operation" of the line. In a non-public report published by SinEmbargo.mx after the collapse, SYSTRA added the wear and tear of the work was unusual for an up-to-two-years-old project, which they attributed to "mediocre quality" works. The group concluded to avoid future problems, the Metro system would need to correct the origin of the wear because repairs would be temporary fixes and the defects would return. They informed governmental authorities it would not be possible to permanently solve the problems and suggested to the creation of a maintenance manual based on the needs of the line to perpetually maintain it.

In 2015, the Superior Auditor of the Federation (ASF) concluded the construction process presented 12 irregularities, including the incompatibility between the train wheels and the rails that could cause track instabilities, and that train operations were within the accepted safety limit. According to Florencia Serranía, in 2016, the French company Tricaud Societé Organisé (TSO) was contracted to maintain daily operating conditions of the line's fixed installations and did not report any concerns before the collapse. The cost to address these problems was over MX$1.2 billion.

The 2017  Puebla earthquake damaged the line's tracks and forced six stations, from Tezonco station to the eastern terminal, to temporarily close. Tezonco and Olivos stations were reopened three days later; Olivos served as the provisional terminal station for about a month while the other stations underwent repairs. Experts told Associated Press reporters the line needed to be closed and thoroughly inspected rather than being reinforced. The ASF made observations of damage to the section that ultimately collapsed. Following the earthquake, residents had reported the structure showed visible structural cracks. Transport authorities made repairs following these complaints. They also repaired a column between Olivos and Nopalera stations that showed cracks in its base in January 2018. Before the 2020 COVID-19 pandemic, residents provided photographs and videos to the authorities for them to review the bridge, which the residents perceived was buckling and that the structure was moving abnormally as trains passed by. By the end of 2019, engineering company Ingeniería, Servicios y Sistemas Aplicados (ISSA) conducted a study of the structural and geotechnical behavior of the overpass, finding no risk to the line's operation.

Collapse

On 3 May 2021 at 22:22 CDT (UTC−5), an eastbound train was passing on the track between Olivos and Tezonco stations in Tláhuac. Around  before reaching Olivos station, the section between columns 12 and 13 collapsed when its girder failed and broke in half, causing the rear two train cars to fall off the track. The fallen cars were suspended in a V-shape with one car hitting the ground and the other left dangling. Debris fell onto an automobile traveling on Tláhuac Avenue, killing the driver and injuring his wife.

A total of 26 people—15 of whom died at the scene—died in the collapse; and 98 others were hospitalized. It was the Metro's deadliest incident since 1975, when a collision between two trains killed 31 passengers; it was also the system's third fatal accident in 14 months. After the collapse, 22 people were reported missing. By 6 May, the number of unaccounted-for people decreased to five. According to the city government, it is likely none of them were on board the train because they had been missing since days before the accident.

According to Rodrígo García, the driver of the crashed train, meters before arriving at Olivos station he perceived a jolt in the train, after which his control board indicated a power failure. García activated the emergency brake, left the cab, and saw smoke and passengers leaving the train in the last car. The control center asked him to verify the situation and to reassure the passengers if necessary. He was subsequently notified of the collapse. In the fifth-and-last-available car, García found injured and unconscious people. He estimated the train was three-quarters full.

The STC warned residents to avoid the area. Immediately, witnesses began rescue efforts and were later joined by first-response teams. Neighbors offered rescuers coffee, water, and bread. A shopping mall in the zone emptied its parking lot and allowed authorities to set up a control post. Rescue efforts were suspended after a few hours because the structure was unstable. A crane was dispatched to hoist sections of the train while search-and-rescue teams searched for survivors. The first train car was removed the next day at 09:20 CDT and the other before 14:00 that day. The debris had been removed by the end of May.

Immediate aftermath

Service on the entirety of Line 12 was suspended. The following day, the line was replaced with 490 city buses, which were insufficient to meet passenger demand. To complement the service, the city contracted buses from the company Autobuses de Oriente, and approved temporary routes toward Tasqueña, Universidad, Atlalilco, and Coyuya metro stations. The federal government declared three days of national mourning. Social media users reported structural damage at other elevated stations, including Oceanía, Consulado, and Pantitlán; Sheinbaum said the stations would be examined. The general secretary of the Mexican Union of Metro Workers announced around 8,000 workers would go on strike due to unsafe working conditions.

The office of the federal Attorney General (FGR), its Mexico City counterpart (FGJCDMX) headed by Ernestina Godoy Ramos, and Norwegian risk management firm Det Norske Veritas (DNV) were appointed to investigate the collapse. Sheinbaum said the families of those who were killed would receive MX$700,000 (US$35,000) each, including MX$50,000 (US$2,500) from the city and MX$650,000 (US$32,650) from the Metro. The compensation was later increased to MX$1,870,000 per family.

When Serranía was asked about satellite images that showed the collapsed section was slightly warped, she said; "There is no such information, it is not true". National Regeneration Movement (MORENA), the ruling party of Mexico, voted against creating a special commission to investigate the collapse, calling it a "scavenger" proposal because the collapse had no "urgent and obvious resolution". Sheinbaum and Ebrard, the then-current and former heads of government of Mexico City, are protégés of president López Obrador and have been considered leading candidates of MORENA for the 2024 presidential election. According to international journalists, the collapse may affect their presidential campaigns because Ebrard had overseen the construction of Line 12, which was considered his "signature infrastructure project", while Sheinbaum had over two years to address concerns regarding the line's condition and to ensure the line was properly maintained.

Reactions
Minutes after the collapse, Sheinbaum arrived at the accident site. Ebrard, the Secretary of Foreign Affairs when the incident happened, said on Twitter; "What happened today in the Metro is a terrible tragedy ... My sympathy to the victims and their families". The following morning, president López Obrador gave his condolences and said; "Nothing will be hidden, we should not fall into speculations ... no accusations will be made without evidence". Carlos Slim's Grupo Carso, the main constructor of the Periférico Oriente–Zapotitlán section, announced they would wait for the official expert analyses before offering any statement on the incident.

Protests and tributes

In the days following the collapse, protesters who were upset over the incident and the authorities' responses vandalized several Metro stations, breaking glass platform partitions and painting slogans such as "It wasn't an accident—It was negligence" on station walls. Demonstrators marched from Periférico Oriente station to the accident site carrying banners that read "It was not an accident, those responsible have first and last names" and "Corruption kills and the dead are always the people". Residents set up an altar in a shopping mall near the site of the collapse. On 7 May, hundreds of protesters demanding justice held a vigil at the scene of the accident.

For the Day of the Dead observance in 2021, local residents called on others to place a thematic altar called "Train to Mictlān". On the eve of the first anniversary of the collapse, the National Action Party (PAN), an opposition party, placed an anti-monument on Paseo de la Reforma in front of the Antimonumento +43 memorial. The PAN anti-monument references the overpass collapse and includes the legends "#FueMorena" (#ItWasMorena) and "La tragedia de la Línea 12" (The tragedy of Line 12) on a wine-colored plinth, referencing MORENA's institutional colors. On the anniversary of the collapse, family members, survivors, and residents visited the site, where they placed altars and candles. They told journalists they would ask the city council for permission to place a memorial in front of the collapsed area.

Investigations

DNV report

On 5 May 2022, the government of the city contracted DNV to conduct a detailed, independent investigation into the collapse. It was decided to split it into three parts and each would receive a payment: the first part, which cost 8,169,343 pesos, would discuss the preliminary causes that led to the accident; the second part was to include the immediate cause and cost 5,049,743 pesos; and the final part, costing 9,394,914 pesos, would include the root cause and recommendations for the line's reopening. According to the contract, DNV was allowed "to collect information for documentary analyses, covering design, construction, rehabilitation, intervention, operation, maintenance and supervision" of the line until the date of the collapse.

DNV published the first part of the report on 16 June 2021; it found structural faults linked to six construction deficiencies:

A poor welding process of Nelson studs
Porosity and lack of union in the stud–beam joint
Lack of Nelson studs in the beams that span the bridge assembly
Different types of concrete were used on the girder
Unfinished and/or improperly executed welds
Supervision and dimensional control in fillet welds

DNV investigated the appropriateness of the design and materials used for the line; whether the structure's performance fulfilled the design requirements; and whether the operations, repairs, and renovations had affected the bridge. The group reported fewer studs than required to support the structure had been used, and that the concrete that covered them might have been faulty. The firm also noted in August 2010, supervisors issued an alert related to the construction of the Tezonco–Olivos overpass stating only ten reinforcement bars were to be used in the bridge, although the project plans originally specified twenty of them. According to El Financiero, the report excluded four additional lines of research; "lateral-torsional buckling of the steel beams", "crushing of the concrete slab", "influence of loads from the railroad system", and "lack of infrastructure maintenance".

DNV was expected to deliver the second part of the report on 14 July 2021, however, the group postponed it until 7 September that year. In the 180-page investigation, DNV concluded the collapse was caused by the lack of functional Nelson studs in the stretch, which led to the buckling of the north and south beams. This led the girders to work independently from each other in conditions for which they were not created, driving the distortion to the central transverse frame and causing fatigue in the support. Poor distribution of the existing studs and poor welds in the zone further contributed to the collapse.

The third part of the report was expected in August 2021 but it was delivered on 28 February the following year. The city's government rejected the report's conclusions and reserved its publication. Sheinbaum acknowledged the report on 4 May 2022 and said it was declined because it was a "deficient, poorly produced, ... tendentious and false" document that presented "technical issues"; that it serves the country's opposition parties; that DNV unilaterally changed the methodology the group originally presented when it was hired; and she said the company had a conflict of interest because one of DNV's lawyers had previously litigated against López Obrador. She also announced a civil lawsuit against DNV and that the firm would not receive a payment for the last part of the report. Andrés Lajous, the head of the city's Secretary of Mobility, explained that the change in the report's methodology referred to DNV's decision to "plant maintenance" as a cause of the collapse. DNV said their report was delivered "in accordance with the agreed RCA [root cause analysis] methodology and to strict internal quality and revision procedures". According to journalist investigations, DNV's lawyer was hired in 2019.

On 9 May 2022, the Spanish newspaper El País published part of the third report. DNV concluded the root cause of the accident was the bridge's design's non-compliance with the standards for bridge construction; a lack of certification by an independent entity—including deficient supervision and changes to the original design; misplaced, poorly welded, or missing studs throughout the girders; and lack of maintenance inspections from 2012 to 2019, even though the manual delivered by ICA–Carso–Alstom recommended thorough annual inspections. The city government released the report two days later and explained in a conference the discrepancies they found in it. Officials said they opposed the report because DNV did not compare the collapsed section with similar segments; because the firm used Google tools—including Google Street View—despite the existence of a disclaimer that said data may not reflect actual conditions; because DNV initially stated the deformations were not visible to the naked eye but later said the opposite by using Google Street View images; because the ICA–Carso–Alstom maintenance manual did not establish methodologies for deformation criteria; because the report initially says no maintenance reports were delivered and then acknowledged there are reports for 2019 and 2020; and because the group did not adhere to the requested methodology. Sheinbaum announced the contract with DNV would be rescinded and a group of engineers would be hired to "present the whole truth".

Other investigations

Three days before DNV released its report, journalists from The New York Times (NYT) published an investigation. The NYT report said the collapse was due to a chain of errors originating in its planning; that the line was hurriedly built as the end of Ebrard's administration was approaching; that the steel studs connecting steel to a slab of concrete failed due to poor-quality welds and the failure to remove ceramic rings; that the city had approved poor-quality work; and that after the 2017 earthquake, audits revealed errors in the original construction—including missing steel components and improperly poured concrete. Sheinbaum criticized the NYT article and said she did not leak information to a journal that denounced the Fourth Transformation—the president's political platform. Ebrard said the collapse was caused by the lack of maintenance rather than by structural faults.

In their investigation, the FGJCDMX found similar results to those of DNV's first report. According to the FGJCDMX report, shear bolts that joined the concrete slabs to the beams were misplaced and in some cases, the bolts and beams were not fused, leading to distortion-induced fatigue. The attorney concluded the collapse occurred when the eastbound beam suddenly yielded and dragged the westbound beam in 1.9 seconds. According to a study carried out by specialists hired by the attorney general's office, the collapsed section had 65 percent of the required bolts. According to a related study, specialists could not find evidence of inspection reports of problems related to the bridge. The same study said the existing malformations and defects would have been detected if these examinations had been carried out in a specialized manner through appropriate maintenance.

The College of Civil Engineers of Mexico (CICM) conducted independent studies of Line 12, except for the collapsed area. They observed the bridge has two types of girders: from Culhuacán to Calle 11 stations—built by ICA—the section uses concrete girders and from Periférico Oriente to Zapotitlán stations—built by Carso—the overpass uses steel girders. They also found 68 percent of the elevated section had minor and common deficiencies. In comparison, the remaining 32 percent—all within the section between Periférico Oriente and Zapotitlán stations—presented vulnerabilities that would require additional analyses. These vulnerabilities include poor welds, improper spacing between beams, fissures in columns and beams, and irregularities in the steel structure support.

Planned reopening

According to Sheinbaum, reconstruction of the collapsed section was expected to be completed by the end of 2022. A week after the collapse, STC considered reopening only the underground section. In their report, the CICM recommended against reopening unless a reinforcement and rehabilitation project is conducted. The institute also advised against reopening the underground section because the railway workshops, which are needed for train maintenance, are located after Tláhuac station.

In June 2021, Sheinbaum discussed with ICA and Carso the possibility of them paying for the reconstruction of the elevated section. On 22 June, López Obrador met with Sheinbaum and Slim, and they agreed Slim would help with the reconstruction, which López Obrador said should be carried out "as soon as possible", and "that within a year at the latest, Line 12 [would] be back in operation with full safety". A week later, López Obrador said Carso agreed to rebuild the collapsed section free of charge, and Slim commented:I am convinced that [the line] was made with the best structural engineers of Mexico, who did the calculations, the design, and if you recall it, in October 2012, around November ... the project was approved, which was performed by international experts, and for that, I am convinced that it has no inherent vices. So much so that the President of the Republic, the head of government and the head of government-elect boarded it, and they invited us and lots of people to travel, we traveled around 12 kilometers [7.5 miles].

Reconstruction work on the collapsed section started on 16 February 2022. Sheinbaum confirmed the leaked information and said the material that was not used in the construction of Felipe Ángeles International Airport was used for the reinforcement of Line 12.

The subway section of Line 12, which runs from Mixcoac to Atlalilco stations, reopened on January 15, 2023. In preparation for the reopening, 15,000 ties and rails in several interstation tunnels were replaced, leaks were repaired, and the track ballast was replaced with a firmer material. The section will operate with 13 trains and will be patrolled by members of the National Guard—the gendarmerie force command of the Secretariat of National Defense—placed inside all of the metro stations days after the 2023 Mexico City Metro train crash occurred; Sheinbaum said the system was under attack from saboteurs.

Aftermath and litigation

After the release of the first DNV report on the collapse, Grupo Carso lost 7.8 billion pesos on the Mexican Stock Exchange. The company lost a further 2.7 billion pesos after they announced they would rebuild the collapsed section. Florencia Serranía was removed from her position on 28 June 2021 and was replaced by Guillermo Calderón, the Servicio de Transportes Eléctricos general director. Days before the delivery of its second report, DNV filed a complaint with the FGJCDMX due to a breach in the chain of custody of a package containing evidence that was sent to the United States for further studies. When the package returned to Mexico, the box containing the samples had been tampered with, potentially affecting the investigation.

In August 2021, the FGJCDMX began an investigation of eleven welders and two supervisors. In October that year, the office announced charges of manslaughter, injury, and property damage would be brought against Line 12 project director Enrique Horcasitas, and nine former officials and supervisors—several of whom were disqualified in 2014 and 2015 from holding any public office in Mexico City—for their participation in the planning and construction of the line. Horcasitas' defense said the errors occurred when the city wanted to modify the original project—including the contracting of companies other than those stipulated—and that the line's infrastructure had not been properly maintained since its opening. According to the attorney, who also defended four others, the Spanish version of DNV's report omits information related to maintenance on the line. The ten ex-officials were formally charged in December 2021 and, as of January 2023, are awaiting trial.

Carso estimated the reconstruction and reinforcement of the collapsed bridge will cost the company 800 million pesos. In November 2021, the group said in 2010 it subcontracted the stud-welding company J. J. Jiménez, S. A. de C. V. and that Carso subsequently supervised the work through a verification system that evaluated the welding of the studs, their alignment, and their final positions.

By February 2022, 80 percent of those involved had received compensation from Carso's CICSA division in a deal in which no-one would take legal action or request further sums of money in the future. By May that year, the amount had increased to 90 percent. The range of compensation varied according to the seriousness of the injuries from 450,000 pesos (US$21,600) to six million pesos (US$290,000)—the latter for the families of the dead victims. The company also reserved the right to demand reimbursement of the compensation paid to the victims from those found legally responsible for the collapse, and to take legal action against responsible parties. In February 2022, the remaining parties who had not signed the compensation deal were in the process of taking legal action against Carso.

Notes

References

Further reading
 
 
  Includes a 26-minute video in which Tomás Andrade Ramos, an architectural engineer, explains the composition of the structure and the elements that contributed to the collapse.

External links

 Line 12 openness website by the Government of Mexico City (in Spanish)
 DNV's technical report of the accident, published by the Government of Mexico City (in Spanish)

2020s in Mexico City
2020s road incidents in North America
2021 disasters in Mexico
2021 in Mexico
2021 road incidents
Bridge disasters in Mexico
Metro overpass collapse
May 2021 events in North America
Overpass collapse
Railway accidents and incidents in Mexico
Railway accidents in 2021
Road incidents in Mexico